2-amino-3,7-dideoxy-D-threo-hept-6-ulosonate synthase (ADH synthase, ADHS, MJ0400 (gene)) is an enzyme with systematic name L-aspartate 4-semialdehyde:1-deoxy-D-threo-hexo-2,5-diulose 6-phosphate methylglyoxaltransferase. This enzyme catalyses the following chemical reaction

 L-aspartate 4-semialdehyde + 1-deoxy-D-threo-hexo-2,5-diulose 6-phosphate  2-amino-3,7-dideoxy-D-threo-hept-6-ulosonate + 2,3-dioxopropyl phosphate

The enzyme plays a key role in an alternative pathway of the biosynthesis of 3-dehydroquinate.

References

External links 
 

EC 2.2.1